Resourcesat-2A is a follow on mission to Resourcesat-1 and Resourcesat-2 which were launched in October 2003 and in April 2011 respectively. The new satellite provides the same services as the other Resourcesat missions. It will give regular micro and macro information on land and water bodies below, farm lands and crop extent, forests, mineral deposits, coastal information, rural and urban spreads besides helping in disaster management.

Instruments 
The satellite contains three instruments on board:

 Advanced Wide-Field Sensor (AWiFS) - it operates in three spectral bands in VNIR and one band in SWIR. It provides images with 56 meter spatial resolution that would be useful at the State level.
 Linear Imaging Self-Scanning Sensor-3 (LISS-3) - it operates in three-spectral bands, two in VNIR and one in Short Wave Infrared (SWIR) bandwidth. With 23.5 meter spatial resolution it can provide images at the district level. It has a swath of 740 km and revisit period of 5 days.
 Linear Imaging Self-Scanning Sensor-4 (LISS-4) - it operates in three spectral bands in the Visible and Near Infrared Region (VNIR) with 5.8 meter spatial resolution that can provide information at taluk level. It has swath of 70 km and revisit period of 5 days.

The satellite also carries two Solid State Recorders with a capacity of 200 Gigabits to store the images which can be read out later to ground stations.

Launch 
The satellite was launched aboard PSLV-C36, the 38th flight of Polar Satellite Launch Vehicle (PSLV-XL), on 7 December 2016, at 04:54 UTC. For the first time, Indian Regional Navigation Satellite System (IRNSS) processor and receiver was used to navigate PSLV.

See also 

 List of Indian satellites

References

External links 
 Official Website 

Earth observation satellites of India
Spacecraft launched by India in 2016
Spacecraft launched by PSLV rockets